Sentimento is a 2002 album by Andrea Bocelli

Sentimento (Italian and Portuguese "feeling") may also refer to:
Sentimento (Bonga album), 1985
Sentimento (EP), a 2009 EP by Valerio Scanu
Sentimento (Valerio Scanu song)
"Sentimento", a 1968 song by Patty Pravo
"Sentimento", by Piccola Orchestra Avion Travel, winning song at Sanremo Music Festival 2000

See also
Sentimiento (disambiguation) (Spanish)